Lindholm is a small Danish uninhabited island located in Stege Bugt. Lindholm covers an area of 0.07 km2.

Until 2018 the island housed a field station belonging to the veterinary institute of the Technical University of Denmark.  Starting in 1938 a vaccine against foot-and-mouth disease was produced on the island.

The Danish government considered but eventually shelved a plan to house, on the island, unsuccessful applicants for asylum with criminal records who could not otherwise be deported.

References 

Islands of Denmark
Geography of Vordingborg Municipality